Otehake River is located on the West Coast of the South Island of New Zealand. It flows northward through the Arthur's Pass National Park and into the Taramakau River.

References

Westland District
Rivers of the West Coast, New Zealand
Rivers of New Zealand